Charlie Hugh Mountford is a humorist and poet. His family, originally from Birmingham, England, came to Canada early in the twentieth century. He was educated at the University of Western Ontario (MA English) and The University of London (MA Librarianship). He has written books of humorous monologues and books of poetry. He has been a banker, a school librarian, a researcher of historical buildings and the founder and artistic director of Poetry Stratford, A Reading Series. He has also written the librettos for five modern chamber operas which have been produced in Stratford. He enjoys performing his humorous monologues as solo shows. Charlie and his wife, Ruth,(who is a professional photographer) live in Stratford, Ontario and, part-time, in Quebec City.

Works
 The Harvestman (2004), 
 The Night the Ducks Got Loose (2006), 
 Voice Of An Angel (Opera Libretto, produced Stratford, 2000)
 A Stronger Thought Of Love (Opera Libretto, produced Stratford, 2006)
 Henry Hudson (Opera Libretto, produced Stratford, 2008)
 The Thing On The Comb (2011), 
 Worried About Love (2013), 
 The Swan Dive (2013), 
 The Teeth of Tarpon Springs (2014), 
 A Fine House In Shaking Bay (2014), 
 A Joker, A Toker A Real Estate Broker (2014), 
 painterly (2015), 
 D'Arcy (Opera Libretto, produced in Stratford, 2016) 
 Edna loves Stumpy (2016), 
 Dracool or the pleasure of his company (2017),

Awards
i)First Prize, Alberta Poetry Contest, short poem category        
ii)Caroline Kizer Workshop Prize, University of Indiana
iii)Finalist, 2009, Atlanta Review Poetry Competition
iv)Shortlisted, Bridport UK Poetry Competition 2008, 2010, x2 2017
v)Highly Commended Prize, poetry, Bridport UK Prize 2017

References

External links
 The League of Canadian Poets
 The Writers' Union of Canada
 Poetry Stratford
 Start Stratford Arts and Culture Magazine

20th-century Canadian poets
Canadian male poets
Living people
University of Western Ontario alumni
Alumni of the University of London
20th-century Canadian male writers
Year of birth missing (living people)